David Thorburn may refer to:

 David Thorburn (politician) (1790–1862), Scottish-born merchant and political figure in Upper Canada
 David Thorburn (banker) (born 1958), Scottish banker
 David Thorburn (scholar), American literature scholar